Barracuda is a 2017 American suspense drama directed by Jason Cortlund and Julia Halperin and written by Jason Cortlund. The film stars Allison Tolman, Sophie Reid, JoBeth Williams, Luis Bordonada, Larry Jack Dotson and Angelo Dylen. The film was released on October 6, 2017, by Orion Pictures and Samuel Goldwyn Films.

Plot
A young British woman named Sinaloa comes to Texas to find Merle, her half-sister by way of their dead country musician father. It doesn’t take long for Sinaloa to charm her way into Merle’s life. Her singing awakens something in Merle and erases any lingering doubts about their shared bloodline. But an all-too-familiar chaos comes with it, which soon starts to unravel Merle’s stable world—her job, her upcoming marriage, and an already tense relationship with her mother, Patricia. And while the family music legacy brought this stranger to town, darker motives are woven into the songs she sings, showing glimpses of a violent rage that’s been building for years.

Cast  
Allison Tolman as Merle
Sophie Reid as Sinaloa
JoBeth Williams as Patricia
Luis Bordonada as Raul
Larry Jack Dotson as Spud
Angelo Dylen as Ray
Tanner Beard as Trace
Monique Straw as Andrea

Release
The film premiered at South by Southwest on March 11, 2017. On July 11, 2017, Orion Pictures and Samuel Goldwyn Films acquired distribution rights to the film. The film was released on October 6, 2017, by Orion Pictures and Samuel Goldwyn Films.

References

External links
 
 

2017 films
2017 thriller films
American thriller films
2010s English-language films
2010s American films